The 2019–20 Women's Senior One Day Trophy was the 14th edition of the women's List A cricket competition in India. It was scheduled to be played from 18 February to 20 March 2020 in a round-robin and knockout format. However, the tournament was ended after the round-robin stage due to the COVID-19 pandemic, with the knockout stages cancelled. There was therefore no overall winner, although three teams were promoted from the Plate Group.

Competition format
The 37 teams competing in the tournament were divided into the Elite Group and the Plate Group, with the teams in the Elite Group further divided into Groups A, B and C. The tournament operated on a round-robin format, with each team playing every other team in their group once. Teams in the Plate Group competed for promotion to the Elite Group, with three teams achieving this for the following season, whilst teams in the Elite Group competed to progress to the knockout stage quarter-finals, which were cancelled due to the COVID-19 pandemic.

The groups worked on a points system with positions with the groups being based on the total points. Points were awarded as follows:

Win: 4 points. 
Tie: 2 points. 
Loss: 0 points. 
No Result/Abandoned: 2 points. 

If points in the final table are equal, teams are separated by most wins, then head-to-head record, then Net Run Rate.

League stage

Points tables

Elite Group A

Elite Group B

Elite Group C

Plate Group

Source: BCCI

Fixtures

Elite Group A

Elite Group B

Elite Group C

Plate Group

Knockout stage
The knockout stages were cancelled just before the quarter-final stage was scheduled to begin, due to the COVID-19 pandemic.

References

 

Women's Senior One Day Trophy
Women's Senior One Day Trophy
Women's Senior One Day Trophy
Women's Senior One Day Trophy